Suhas Palshikar is a Hindi and Marathi film and television actor from India.

Career
Palshikar made his debut in a small role in the Richard Attenborough's Oscar-winning film Gandhi in 1982. He had received IIFA Award nomination for Best Performance in a Negative Role in the movie Chandni Bar in 2002. Among his memorable roles is that of Laliya in the movie Ankush.

Filmography

Television

 1997 Byomkesh Bakshi as Naresh Mandal in the episode Dhokadhari
 2017 Rudram (TV series)

2019 Agnihotra 2 (TV series)

Films

 2021   Basta (2021 film)
 2018 Bhavesh Joshi Superhero – Barve
 2018 Ani... Dr. Kashinath Ghanekar - Master Dattaram
 2017 Sarkar 3 – CM Mohan Naik
 2016 Barad – Shyamrao Patil (anna)
 2016 Reti – Revenue minister
 2015 Rangaa Patangaa 
 2015 Aabhraan – Gulabrao
 2015 Bioscope
 2014 Dhyaas – Circus owner
 2013 Kuni Ghar Deta Ka Ghar
 2013 Touring Talkies – Bapu Sheth
 2013 Tuhya Dharma Koncha? – Gurudev
 2012 Aik
 2009 Hello! Gandhe Sir
 2007 Dohaa – Vishnu
 2006 Manthan: Ek Amrut Pyala
 2001 Chandni Bar – Irfan Mamu (as Suhas Palsikar)
 2001 Ashi hi Gyaneshwari
 1992 Karm Yodha – Mahesh Desai's Henchmen
 1987 Pratighaat
 1986 Ankush – Laliya
 1982 Gandhi – Hindu Youth in Calcutta Street

References

External links
 

Male actors from Mumbai
Indian male film actors
Male actors in Hindi cinema
Male actors in Marathi cinema
20th-century Indian male actors
21st-century Indian male actors
Male actors in Hindi television